Luna 25 (Luna-Glob lander) is a planned lunar lander mission by Roscosmos. It will land near the lunar south pole at the Boguslavsky crater. It was renamed from Luna-Glob lander to Luna 25 to emphasize the continuity of the Soviet Luna programme from the 1970s, though it is still part of what was at one point conceptualized as the Luna-Glob lunar exploration program. As of February 2023, the launch is scheduled for 13 July 2023.

History 
Nascent plans for what is now Luna 25 began in the late 1990s, with the evaluation of two spacecraft designs having taken place by 1998. Attempts to revive and complete the project continued throughout the 2000s and were punctuated by an aborted attempt at international cooperation via a merger with JAXA's now-cancelled Lunar-A orbiter, and pressure from another attempted cooperative lunar mission with Indian Space Research Organisation (ISRO) (which continued without Russia's involvement).

Delays in the 2010s came first from the significant rework and delay brought on by the failure of Phobos-Grunt in 2011. This is the point at which the modern Luna 25 design was developed. Later, work on the lander was slowed by resource pressures being placed upon spacecraft developer NPO Lavochkin, such as the weather satellite Elektro-L No.2 and the Spektr-RG observatory  as well the landing platform Russia was contributing to ExoMars 2020.

By 2017, the propulsion system for the spacecraft was in assembly.

Mission 
Initial mission plans called for a lander and orbiter, with the latter also deploying impact penetrators. In its current form, Luna 25 is a lander only, with a primary mission of proving out the landing technology. The mission will carry  of scientific instruments, including a robotic arm for soil samples and possible drilling hardware.

The launch is currently scheduled to occur in 13 July 2023 on a Soyuz-2.1b rocket with Fregat upper stage, from Vostochny Cosmodrome.

Science payload 
The lander will feature a  payload composed by 9 notional science instruments:
 ADRON-LR, active neutron and gamma-ray analysis of regolith
 ARIES-L, measurement of plasma in the exosphere
 LASMA-LR, laser mass-spectrometer
 LIS-TV-RPM, infrared spectrometry of minerals and imaging
 PmL, measurement of dust and micro-meteorites
 THERMO-L, measurement of the thermal properties of regolith
 STS-L, panoramic and local imaging
 Laser retroreflector, Moon libration and ranging experiments
 BUNI, power and science data support

LINA-XSAN, a Swedish payload, was to fly with Luna 25, but delays to the launch date caused Sweden to cancel this plan. Instead, LINA-XSAN flew on Chang'e 4 in 2019.

ESA's PILOT-D navigation demonstration camera was planned to be flown on this mission, but is already being procured from a commercial service provider and will fly along with them on their mission due to continued international collaboration has been thrown into doubt by the 2022 Russian invasion of Ukraine and related sanctions on Russia.

See also 

 Lunar water
 Russian lunar manned spacecraft

References

External links 
 Lunar and Planetary Department Moscow University
 Soviet Luna Chronology
 Exploring the Moon: Luna Missions

Missions to the Moon
Russian space probes
Russian lunar exploration program
2023 in Russia
2023 in spaceflight
Proposed space probes